The Republic of Ireland national beach soccer team has represented the Republic of Ireland in international beach soccer competitions, under the control of the Football Association of Ireland, the governing body for football in Ireland. After competing in the 2001 and 2002 seasons in the Euro Beach Soccer League and Cup, the team has been inactive since.

A number of notable former association footballers took part in the time the team was active, including former Arsenal and Manchester United forward, Frank Stapleton, and former Blackburn Rovers manager, Owen Coyle who in 2015 recalled his participation with fondness whilst commenting on the difficulty of adapting to a sand surface having played his career on grass.

Squad
Correct as of June 2002

Head Coach: Derek O´Neil
Head Delegation: Andy Clark

Achievements
 Euro Beach Soccer League best: 8th place
 2001
 Euro Beach Soccer Cup best: 8th place
 2002

Results

All Time Record
As of February 2002

External links

 Squad
 2001 results
 2002 results

European national beach soccer teams
Beach Soccer